Nénigan is a commune in the Haute-Garonne department in southwestern France.

Population

Geography
The river Gesse forms all of the commune's eastern border; the Gimone forms all of its western border.

See also
Communes of the Haute-Garonne department

References

Communes of Haute-Garonne